Macunaíma may refer to:
 Macunaíma (novel)
 Macunaíma (film)
 Cocktails with cachaça#Macunaíma, a cocktail